is the fifth Japanese single by South Korean girl group Kara. It was included in their second Japanese album, Super Girl (2011). It was released digitally on October 12, 2011, and physically on October 19, 2011. It was released in three different editions.

Background
Information about a fifth Japanese single first surfaced on the internet when member Nicole tweeted to fellow member JiYoung on Twitter, "Starting from now, spend all your time together with me!!!! You're mine You're mine You're mine!!", to which she replied, "Unnie (Nicole), you too, you're mine you're mine you're mine! Bounce, bounce, be~ mine~~". Nicole then tweeted back by saying "I see, therefore unnie (herself) will take responsibility for you until the end [..]". Fellow member Goo Hara also tweeted in regards to the posts made by her fellow members: "Heehee, such cute kids. Giving hints like that is... ㅋㅋㅋㅋㅋ(*laughs*)". This led to many fans believing that the members were hinting on possible lyrics for their next single that will be released in the future.

On September 16, 2011, Universal Music Japan officially announced on the group's Japanese homepage that they will be releasing their fifth Japanese single on October 19 and will be titled "Winter Magic". The album covers for the album were then unveiled on September 27.

The song first hit the Japan radio and immediately afterwards a radio rip surfaced online at September 24.

Music video
A teaser for the music video was released on Universal Music Japan's YouTube channel on October 10, 2011. 
The full music video was released on October 12.

Synopsis
The video begins with the group, dressed in white night gowns, singing together to the intro of the song while sitting warmly inside a modern living room near a fireplace. As the song begins, the scene shifts towards morning where each member is seen emerging from their own houses dressed in warm winter clothing. They then head to the town by themselves to wait for someone. The video ends with someone finally arriving and each of the group members' smiles can be seen.

Live performances
The group made their first live performance of the song at TV Asahi's  Music Station on October 14, 2011 and made another performances on the shows Count Down TV in October 23, on Music Japan and made an apparition in the show Music Lovers, both in October 24.

The group also appeared at an all star Christmas live event called "LAWSON present MUSIC FOR ALL, ALL FOR ONE" supported by Sukapaa" which was held during a three-day span between December 23 and 25 at the Yoyogi National Gymnasium. They appeared on the 24th where they performed the X'mas version of the song along with their past singles and hits.

Track listing

Chart performance and sales
Before its full release, the song had already topped the Recochoku mobile daily chart for the most ringtone downloads.

Oricon Chart

Other charts

Sales and certifications

Release history

References

External links
 

2011 singles
Dance-pop songs
Japanese-language songs
Kara (South Korean group) songs